Oscar Donald "Ski" Melillo (August 4, 1899 – November 14, 1963) was an American second baseman and coach in Major League Baseball. In a 12-season career, Melillo was a .260 hitter (1,316-for-5,063) with 22 home runs and 548 RBI in 1,377 games, including 590 runs, 210 doubles, 64 triples, and 69 stolen bases.

Career
A native of Chicago, Melillo reached the majors in 1926 with the Browns, spending nine and a half years with them before moving to the Boston Red Sox (1935–37). Basically a line-drive hitter, he enjoyed a good year in 1929 ending with a .296 batting average in 141 games, hitting for the cycle on May 23. His most productive season came in 1931, when he hit .306 with five home runs, 88 runs, 189 hits, 34 doubles and 11 triples, all career numbers, while adding 75 runs batted in, a significant offensive contribution for a middle infielder of his era.

As a second baseman, in 1930 Melillo handled 971 chances without committing an error (17 fewer that Nap Lajoie's 1908 MLB record). In 1933, he hit .292 with a career-high 79 RBI and posted a .991 fielding average that stood for more than 10 years.

That season, he received his only chance to manage at the Major League level when he became a late-season replacement for Gabby Street. Melillo finished with a 2–7 mark (.222) as the Browns lost 97 games and placed seventh in the eight-team American League. He later served as a coach for the Indians under Oscar Vitt and Lou Boudreau (1939–40; 1942; 1945–48; 1950). After the 1947 season, he was dropped from Boudreau's coaching staff at the insistence of owner Bill Veeck. Melillo spent part of 1948 managing in the Indians' farm system, but returned to Cleveland to serve part of the year as an aide to Boudreau for the 1948 world champions. After spending the 1949 season as a minor league manager, he coached under Boudreau in 1950, his final year with the Indians, then again with the Red Sox (1952–53) and Kansas City Athletics (1955–56).

Managerial record

Personal life
Melillo was nicknamed Ski and Spinach. In 1926, Melillo suffered from Bright's disease. Melillo's doctor prescribed him a diet of spinach as a result. He also suffered from zoophobia, a generic term for the class of specific phobias to particular animals, including rabbits, birds and snakes. His animal phobia led to many pranks from both opposing players and teammates.

Melillo died of a heart attack in his home city of Chicago at the age of 64.

See also
 List of Major League Baseball players to hit for the cycle

References

External links
, or Retrosheet

1899 births
1963 deaths
Baseball players from Chicago
Boston Red Sox coaches
Boston Red Sox players
Cleveland Indians coaches
Cleveland Indians scouts
Kansas City Athletics coaches
Major League Baseball second basemen
Major League Baseball third base coaches
Milwaukee Brewers (minor league) players
St. Louis Browns coaches
St. Louis Browns players
St. Louis Browns managers
Sportspeople from Chicago
Winnipeg Maroons (baseball) players